Colotis euippe is a butterfly of the family Pieridae that is found in the Afrotropical realm.

The wingspan is 35–45 mm. The adults fly year-round.

The larvae feed on Maerua, Capparis, Cadaba, and Boscia species.

Subspecies
The following subspecies are recognised:
 C. e. euippe (Linnaeus, 1758) – round-winged orange tip (southern Senegal, Gambia, Guinea-Bissau, Guinea, Sierra Leone, Liberia, Ivory Coast, Ghana, Burkina Faso, Togo, Benin, Nigeria, Cameroon, Chad, Central African Republic, Democratic Republic of the Congo, northern Angola)
 C. e. mediata Talbot, 1939 (Democratic Republic of the Congo, Zambia, northern and western Zimbabwe)
 C. e. omphale (Godart, 1819) – smoky orange tip (Democratic Republic of the Congo, Kenya, Tanzania, Malawi, Mozambique, Zimbabwe, Botswana, Namibia, South Africa, Eswatini, Lesotho, Comoros)
 C. e. complexivus (Butler, 1886) (Uganda, Kenya, Tanzania, southern Somalia)
 C. e. exole (Reiche, 1850) (southern Sudan, southern Ethiopia, Somalia, south-western Saudi Arabia, Yemen)
 C. e. mirei Bernardi, 1960 (Tibesti Mountains in Chad)

Life cycle gallery

References

euippe
Butterflies described in 1758
Taxa named by Carl Linnaeus
Lepidoptera of Cape Verde
Butterflies of Africa